The Athens Clipper was a newspaper in Athens, Georgia, USA, for the African American community. It was published from circa 1887 to circa 1912. The four page weekly newspaper was edited by Samuel B. Davis, and its content was restricted mostly to local events in the black community and religious news.  After Davis' death, the paper continued to be edited for several years by his wife Minnie.  Few copies of the Clipper still exist, despite the newspaper's long publication history.

References

External links 

Defunct newspapers published in Georgia (U.S. state)
Companies based in Athens, Georgia
Newspapers established in 1887
Publications disestablished in 1912
Defunct African-American newspapers
Defunct weekly newspapers
1887 establishments in Georgia (U.S. state)
1912 disestablishments in Georgia (U.S. state)